Invasion of Sakhalin may refer to:

Mongol invasions of Sakhalin (1264–1308), during the period of the Mongol Empire
Japanese invasion of Sakhalin (1905), during the Russo-Japanese War
Soviet invasion of South Sakhalin (1945), during World War II